The Messina Grand Prix (Italian: Gran Premio di Messina) a Formula Junior motor race held at Ganzirri Lake circuit (6,200 metres) in Messina, Italy, organized by the Automobile Club d'Italia. The race formed part of the Italian Formula Junior Championship.

Winners

See also
 10 Hours of Messina

References

External links
 Le gare automobilistiche a Messina 
 Cinque gloriose manifestazioni sportive che non esistono più 

 
Sports competitions in Messina
Recurring sporting events established in 1959
Recurring sporting events disestablished in 1961
1959 establishments in Italy
1961 disestablishments in Italy
Formula Junior